Tobias Martin Piers Trevor Cole (born 7 August 1971) is an Australian countertenor and leading artist with Opera Australia.

Early life
Cole was born in Leiden, Netherlands while his father was working at the Leiden University as a radio astronomer. In 1976 he commenced his education at Newington College. Aged eight, he joined the choir of St. James Church in Sydney, as a treble. As a boy soprano, Cole sang with The Australian Opera (in A Midsummer Night’s Dream and Tosca) and with the Sydney Philharmonia Choirs. As a teenager, in 1986/87 Cole toured Europe with the Chapel Choir of Newington College. He was later appointed head chorister of the choir.

Tertiary education
Cole is an honours graduate in music from the University of Sydney, having studied singing, composition, conducting and musicology. He was awarded a 1994 Churchill Fellowship, sponsored by Dame Roma Mitchell, to continue his vocal training with Ashley Stafford at London's Royal College of Music and to also further his studies in Early Music. He later received a Queen's Trust Achiever Award for operatic studies in London. In 2002, he was the first countertenor to win Opera Foundation Australia's Metropolitan Opera Young Artist Study Award and spent three months in New York at the Met.

Performance career
Cole has sung with choirs and vocal ensembles including:
 The Song Company
 The Australian Chamber Singers
 Sydney Chamber Choir
 Choir of St. Paul's Cathedral (London)
 The Llewellyn Choir (Canberra)
 Canberra Choral Society

Cole has performed with companies including:
 Opera Australia – Title role in Giulio Cesare, Eustazio in Rinaldo, Nireno in Cesare and, most recently, as Oberon in A Midsummer Night's Dream
 Queensland Orchestra – St John Passion
 Sydney Philharmonia Choirs – Messiah and Carmina Burana
 Chicago Opera Theater – Oberon in A Midsummer Night's Dream, Apollo in Death in Venice, Ottone in L'incoronazione di Poppea
 West Australian Opera – Medoro in Orlando
 Opera Queensland – Nireno
 English Bach Festival – Fairy Queen
 Queensland Symphony Orchestra and Adelaide Symphony Orchestra – Messiah
 London Handel Festival – Ulisse in Deidamia
 Australian Brandenburg Orchestra – Noel! Noel!
 Pinchgut Opera – Athamas in Semele

Conducting career
 Oriana Chorale, Canberra
 University of Canberra Choir
 Canberra Choral Society
 ANU Chamber Choir

Recordings
 Semele – ABC Classics
 The Renaissance Players – Walsingham Classics

References

1971 births
Living people
Australian conductors (music)
People educated at Newington College
Operatic countertenors
21st-century Australian singers
21st-century conductors (music)
21st-century Australian male singers